The 2004 Fresno State football team represented California State University, Fresno in the 2004 NCAA Division I-A football season. They played their home games at Bulldog Stadium in Fresno, California and were coached by Pat Hill.

Personnel

Coaching Staff

Roster

Schedule

Game Summaries

at Washington

at No. 13 Kansas State

Portland State

at Louisiana Tech

UTEP

at No. 16 Boise State

SMU

at Rice

Hawaii

Nevada

at San Jose State

vs. No. 18 Virginia (2004 MPC Computers Bowl)

References

Fresno State
Fresno State Bulldogs football seasons
Famous Idaho Potato Bowl champion seasons
Fresno State Bulldogs football